Ubbo Janssen Albertsen (May 23, 1845 – November 25, 1926) was an American politician and businessman.

Albertsen was born in Germany. In 1856, Albertsen emigrated with his parents to the United States and settled in Pekin, Illinois. He was involved in the manufacturing business. Albertsen served in the Illinois National Guard. Albertsen served on the Pekin City Council. He also served on the Pekin Community High School Board. He was a Republican. Albertsen served in the Illinois House of Representatives from 1899 to 1901 and hen serve in the Illinois Senate from 1901 to 1905. Albertsen died at his home in Pekin, Illinois.

Notes

External links

1845 births
1926 deaths
German emigrants to the United States
People from Pekin, Illinois
Illinois National Guard personnel
Businesspeople from Illinois
Illinois city council members
School board members in Illinois
Republican Party members of the Illinois House of Representatives
Republican Party Illinois state senators